Kahvi is a netlabel founded in 1998 and currently operated by 4T Thieves. Based in Helsinki, Finland, it aims to release music in the Ogg Vorbis, MP3, WAV and video formats to anyone online on various distribution sites such as Bandcamp, Mixcloud, Scene.org and the Kahvi website. The label has always had a strong connection with the demoscene, and is one among several well-known netlabels, such as Monotonik.

There are over 400 releases from 100+ artists, that are hand picked and released either once or twice a month. All releases have cover artwork, mp3 and ogg download versions and a podcast also broadcasts the release as a single mix.

Roster 
 4T Thieves
 Aleksi Eeben
 Alpha Conspiracy, The
 Bad Loop
 Blamstrain
 Cheju
 Diskreet
 Dreamlin
 Esem
 Kenny Beltrey
 KiloWatts
 Kunds (Artist Lionel Cantegreil)
 Lackluster
 Meso
 Mosaik (formerly known as Radix)
 PinZa
 Planet Boelex
 Realsmokers
 Sense
 Sushi Brother
 Xerxes
 Xhale
 Zainetica

Several guest artists have also been featured over the years as part of special Christmas releases.

 Mark Franklin
 Cell
 Solar Fields
 Richard Devine

While the main focus is freely available music, Kahvi has also released some commercial Digital Download releases.
These releases are available on Beatport, iTunes and other similar digital download outlets.

References

External links 
 Kahvi Collective on Discogs.com
 Kahvi's entire archive via FTP

British independent record labels